Judith Miller (born 16 September 1951) is an antiques expert, writer, and broadcaster based in the UK.

Early career
Born in Galashiels, Scotland, Miller first began collecting antiques while studying history at the University of Edinburgh. In 1979, she co-wrote the Miller's Antiques Price Guide with her first husband, Martin Miller.

Television presenter
Miller has worked as a consultant to and co-presenter of eight series of The Antiques Trail (Meridian, HTV and Discovery), run on the ITV network. She has also presented It's Your Bid for the Discovery Channel. She is a regular expert on the BBC  Antiques Roadshow, and has also appeared on Priceless Antiques Roadshow.

Miller has co-presented The House Detectives on BBC2.

Journalism and lecturer
Miller is a regular contributor to newspapers and magazines including BBC Homes & Antiques, where she writes a four-page feature on 'Starting a Collection'. She has written the antiques column for The Scotsman Magazine and writes a monthly feature for the Financial Times weekend supplement "House and Home". She is the antiques and collecting columnist (fortnightly) for the Saturday Telegraph property supplement. She is the antiques agony aunt with Antiques and Collectables magazine. She writes a monthly feature in Canadian Home and Country magazine and is a regular contributor to US Traditional Home and Country Living.

Miller also regularly lectures at the Victoria and Albert Museum in London and the Smithsonian.

Publishing and select bibliography
In 2001, Miller embarked on a joint venture with Dorling Kindersley to publish two full-colour annual price guides to antiques and collectables, a series of specialist collectors guides and price guides beginning with 'Costume Jewellery'. In 2007 she returned to Miller's, an imprint of Octopus Books (a division of Hachette Livre).

Personal life
Judith Miller lives with her second husband John Wainwright and the youngest of her three children in North London.

Bibliography
Miller has published more than 100 books on antiques and interiors, including:

Co-founder Miller's Antiques Price Guide (first edition 1979)
Miller's Collectables Price Guide (first edition 1989)
Classic Style (Mitchell Beazley), 
Country Finishes and Effects (Mitchell Beazley), 
Country Style (Mitchell Beazley), 
Miller's How to Make Money out of Antiques, 
Miller's Antiques and Collectables
Miller's Antiques Checklists – 12 titles
Miller's Antiques Encyclopedia, 
Miller's Pine and Country Furniture Buyer's Guide, 
Miller's Understanding Antiques, 
Period Details (Mitchell Beazley), 
Period Details Sourcebook (Mitchell Beazley), 
Period Paint Finishes (Mitchell Beazley)
Period Style (Mitchell Beazley), 
Period-style Soft Furnishings (Mitchell Beazley), 
The Style Source Book (Mitchell Beazley)
Victorian Style (Mitchell Beazley), 
Wooden Houses (Ryland Peters & Small), 
Victoriana, 
Miller's Pocket Antiques Factfile, 
Period Finishes and Effects (Mitchell Beazley), 
Miller's Classic Motorcycles Price Guide (Mick Walker), 
More Period Details: The House Renovator's Bible (Mitchell Beazley), 
Care & Repair of Antiques & Collectables (Mitchell Beazley), 
Great Escapes (Ryland, Peters & Small), 
Judith Miller's Guide to Period-Style Curtains and Soft Furnishings (Mitchell Beazley), 
A Closer Look at Antiques (Marshall Publishing), 
Colour (Marshall Publishing), 978-1840282917
The Illustrated Dictionary of Antiques and Collectables (Marshall Publishing), 
The Antiques Hunter's Guide to Europe (Marshall Publishing), 
BBC Antiques Roadshow Antiques Price Guide 2008 (30th Anniversary Edition), 
Dorling Kindersley Antiques Price Guide US 2003–2008 (annual)
Dorling Kindersley Collectables Price Guide UK 2003–2008 (annual)
Dorling Kindersley Collectibles Price Guide US 2003–2008 (annual)
Dorling Kindersley German Antiques Price Guide 2004–2005 & 2006–2007
Grund French Antiques Price Guide 2004–2008 (annual)
Dorling Kindersley Collectors Guide to Costume Jewellery, 
Dorling Kindersley Collectors Guide to Art Nouveau, 
Dorling Kindersley Collectors Guide to Art Deco, 
Dorling Kindersley Collectors Guide to Arts & Crafts, 
Dorling Kindersley Collectors Guide to 20thC Glass, 
Dorling Kindersley Collectors Guide to Tribal Art, 
Inspired Interiors, Jacqui Small Editions, Aurum Press, 
Reader's Digest Buy Keep or Sell, 
Dorling Kindersley Encyclopedia of Furniture, 
Dorling Kindersley Encyclopedia of Decorative Arts, 
Dorling Kindersley Collectors Pocket Book: Handbags, 
Dorling Kindersley Collectors Pocket Book: Metal Toys, 
Dorling Kindersley Collectors Pocket Book: Perfume Bottles, 
Dorling Kindersley Collectors Pocket Book: The Sixties, 
"Modern Country or Country by Jacqui Small Editions", Aurum Press
Dorling Kindersley The Antiques Detective, 
Dorling Kindersley BBC Antiques Roadshow A-Z of Antiques and Collectables, Miller's Antiques Price Guide 2009, Miller's Collectables Price Guide 2009, Miller's Fact Book, Miller's Shoes, Miller's Watches, Chairs, 20th Century Design, Miller's Collectables Handbook 2010–2011, Miller's Antiques Handbook & Price Guide'' 2010–2011,

References

External links
Miller's Antiques Guide
Interview with Judith Miller on The Skirted Roundtable blog
Interview with Judith Miller on Dorling Kindersley website
"Martha Stewart Home & Garden" Show, "Chairs with Judith Miller," October 15, 2009

1951 births
Living people
Alumni of the University of Edinburgh
Antiques experts
Scottish antiquarians
Scottish broadcasters
Scottish television personalities
Scottish non-fiction writers
People from Galashiels